The Dusenberry House is a mid-19th century building located on Main Street in Chatham Borough, Morris County, New Jersey, United States. It is sometimes known as the Presbyterian Parsonage, since it most notable as the home of the Rev. Joseph Meeker Ogden, pastor for 45 years of the Presbyterian church in the town currently named after him. It was also the birthplace of his son, Joseph Wallace Ogden, who founded the brokerage firm J. W. Ogden & Company.

In 1979 it was added to the National Register of Historic Places. It is currently used as a store.

See also
National Register of Historic Places listings in Morris County, New Jersey

References

Houses on the National Register of Historic Places in New Jersey
Houses in Morris County, New Jersey
National Register of Historic Places in Morris County, New Jersey
New Jersey Register of Historic Places
1848 establishments in New Jersey
Houses completed in 1848